The 1992–93 Midland Football Combination season was the 56th in the history of Midland Football Combination, a football competition in England.

Premier Division

The Premier Division featured 18 clubs which competed in the division last season, along with two new clubs:
Meir KA, joined from the Staffordshire Senior Football League
Studley BKL, promoted from Division One

Also, Hinckley merged with Leicestershire Senior League club Barwell Athletic to create new club Barwell.

League table

Division One

The Division One featured 16 clubs which competed in the division last season, along with 5 new clubs:
Kings Heath, relegated from the Premier Division
Marston Green, promoted from Division Two
Hams Hall, promoted from Division Two
Kenilworth Rangers, promoted from Division Two
Sherwood Celtic, promoted from Division Two

Also, Kenilworth Rangers changed name to Kenilworth Town.

League table

Division Two

The Division Two featured 14 clubs which competed in the division last season, along with 7 new clubs:
Ansells
Colletts Green
Meir KA reserves
Holly Lane
Burntwood
Kenilworth Town reserves
Studley BKL reserves

League table

References

1992–93
8